Rogério Dutra da Silva won the title. He defeated the defending champion, Izak van der Merwe, 6–4, 6–7(7–5), 6–3 in the final.

Seeds

Draw

Finals

Top half

Bottom half

References
 Main Draw
 Qualifying Draw

MasterCard Tennis Cup - Singles
MasterCard Tennis Cup
Mast